Kenneth Fuller Gardner (March 5, 1899 – March 9, 1984), nicknamed "Ping", was an American Negro league pitcher in the 1920s and 1930s.

A native of Washington, DC, Gardner made his Negro leagues debut in 1920 with the Brooklyn Royal Giants. He went on to play with several teams, finishing his career in 1932 with the Newark Browns. Gardner died in Charlottesville, Virginia in 1984 at age 85.

References

External links
 and Baseball-Reference Black Baseball stats and Seamheads

1899 births
1984 deaths
Bacharach Giants players
Brooklyn Royal Giants players
Harrisburg Giants players
Hilldale Club players
Lincoln Giants players
Newark Browns players
20th-century African-American sportspeople
Baseball pitchers